Sheldyn Ashlee Cooper (born 29 July 2000) is an Australian cricketer who plays as a right-arm medium-fast bowler and right-handed batter for Western Australia in the Women's National Cricket League (WNCL). She made her WNCL debut on 17 February 2021 against Tasmania.

References

External links

Sheldyn Cooper at Cricket Australia

2000 births
Living people
Sportswomen from Western Australia
Cricketers from Perth, Western Australia
Australian women cricketers
Western Australia women cricketers